The House at 622 Rossie Hill Drive in Park City, Utah, presumably at 622 Rossie Hill Dr., was built around 1895.  It was listed on the National Register of Historic Places in 1984.

It is a one-story frame "T/L cottage".  It has a gable roof and it has shed additions attached to its south and east sides.  A "simple porch spans the length of the stem-wing and wraps around the northwest corner of the building, terminating at an extension of the rear shed addition."

References

National Register of Historic Places in Summit County, Utah
Residential buildings completed in 1895